Eye Cue is a Macedonian pop-rock duo consisting of vocalists Bojan Trajkovski (born 3 October 1983) and Marija Ivanovska (born 9 September 1997), formed in 2008. The group found chart success with "Magija" in 2008, and entered the MTV Adria Top 20 with the song "Not This Time" in 2010. In 2015 they won Skopje Fest with the song "Ubava".

The duo represented Macedonia in the Eurovision Song Contest 2018 with their song "Lost and Found", held in Lisbon, Portugal.

References

Eurovision Song Contest entrants of 2018
Eurovision Song Contest entrants for North Macedonia